Eatoniella demissa is a species of minute sea snail, a marine gastropod mollusk in the family Eatoniellidae, the eatoniellids.

Description
The species is endemic to the King Haakon VII Sea and Davis Sea of Antarctica.

Distribution

References

Eatoniellidae
Gastropods described in 1915
Fauna of the Southern Ocean
Marine fauna of Antarctica